Jari Juhani Helle (August 10, 1962 in Tampere – April 20, 2017) was a Finnish ice hockey player and coach. He had a brief career in the SM-liiga, playing 18 games for Ilves Tampere in 1979-80 and 9 with Lukko Rauma in 1981-82.

He started his coaching career in 1998 as coach of the U-20 team of KooKoo.

He won twice the Italian title, both as coach of HC Bolzano: 2007-2008 (as assistant coach) and 2008-2009 (as head coach).

References

External links
 

1962 births
2017 deaths
Finnish expatriate ice hockey people in Italy
Finnish expatriate ice hockey players in Canada
Finnish ice hockey coaches
Finnish ice hockey players
Ice hockey people from Tampere
Ilves players
Lukko players
Pittsburgh Penguins scouts
Regina Blues players
Regina Pats players